The Body Acoustic is a studio album released by American singer Cyndi Lauper in 2005. It consists of ten previously released songs which have been re-recorded and re-arranged acoustically, as well as two new songs. The album title is a play on Walt Whitman's poem I Sing the Body Electric, with the word body in this case referring to Lauper's body of work as a recording artist. The album features a number of guest artists, including Adam Lazzara, Shaggy, Sarah McLachlan, Jeff Beck, Vivian Green, Ani DiFranco, and Puffy AmiYumi.

A DualDisc edition of the album was released which contained the entire album in enhanced stereo, four new videos directed by Lauper herself as well as a behind-the-scenes featurette on the making of the album. The original pressing of the album became the only album from Cyndi Lauper to be copy-protected using Sony's controversial XCP technology.

Background and production
The album was produced by Rick Chertoff, who worked with the singer on her debut album, She's So Unusual, from 1983, and William Wittman, who produced her At Last album. The twelve songs selected for the record are essentially Lauper's biggest hits, such as "All Through the Night", "Time After Time" and her signature song "Girls Just Wanna Have Fun", all of which are revamped with acoustic jams and sounds of dulcimer played by Lauper herself. Many artists featured in the recordss, including: Shaggy, Ani DiFranco, Adam Lazzara from Taking Back Sunday, Jeff Beck, Puffy AmiYumi, Sarah McLachlan and Vivian Green.  In an interview with Bay Area'''s reporter, the singer said that she had a "wish list" with the artists she always wanted to work with, many of them said yes to the invitation to work on the album.

In an interview with the Brazilian newspaper Extra, the singer said that the album was a special project, with the intervention of the record company and that she does not consider it as a "career album".

Critical reception

The album received good reviews from music critics. Thom Jurek from AllMusic website gave the album three and a half stars out of five and wrote that while the idea of guest songs and acoustic versions might seem like a skewed idea, the album comes across as "entirely new, full of adventure, courage, polish and soul". Barry Waters from the Rolling Stone'' magazine gave the album three stars out of five and noted that " continued progression into quieter material may have left her mainstream rock fans behind years ago, but it has clearly improved her chops." Music critic Robert Christgau gave the album a "Choice Cut" for the song "Money Changes Everything", with that kind of rating he implies that the song "is a good song on an album that's not worth your time or money".

Track listing

Personnel 
 Cyndi Lauper – vocals, appalachian dulcimer, guitar
 Rick Chertoff – piano, producer
 Allison Cornell – violin, viola, dulcimer drone, background vocals
 Jeff Beck – guitar on "Above the Clouds"
 Kat Dyson – slide guitar, rhythm guitar on "Sisters of Avalon"
 Mark Egan – bass guitar
 Steve Gaboury – piano, organs, Roland Juno-60 synthesizer, harmonium
 Jim Hines – trumpet
 Rob Hyman – melodica
 Zev Katz – bass
 Tom Malone – trombone
 Sammy Merendino – drums
 Jamie West-Oram – guitar
 William Wittman – bass guitar, background vocals, producer

Charts

References 

2005 compilation albums
Cyndi Lauper compilation albums
Albums produced by Rick Chertoff
Epic Records compilation albums
Daylight Records albums